Shante Evans (born July 8, 1991) is an American-Slovenian basketball player for Basket 25 Bydgoszcz and the Slovenian national team.

Club career
On 7 February 2022, Galatasaray signed an agreement with Evans, who is a Slovenian of American origin, in the 4th position.

National team career
She participated at the EuroBasket Women 2017 and EuroBasket Women 2019.

Hofstra statistics
Source

References

External links
Hofstra Pride profile

1991 births
Living people
Slovenian women's basketball players
American women's basketball players
American emigrants to Slovenia
Basketball players from Pennsylvania
Hofstra Pride women's basketball players
People from West Chester, Pennsylvania
Power forwards (basketball)
Slovenian expatriate basketball people in Spain
Slovenian people of African-American descent
Sportspeople from Chester County, Pennsylvania
Galatasaray S.K. (women's basketball) players